Uganda will compete at the 2009 World Championships in Athletics from 15–23 August. A team of 11 athletes was announced in preparation for the competition. Selected athletes have achieved one of the competition's qualifying standards. The team of middle and long-distance running specialists features Moses Kipsiro, a 2007 World Championship bronze medallist.

Team selection

Results

Men

Women

References

External links
Official competition website

Nations at the 2009 World Championships in Athletics
World Championships in Athletics
Athletics in Uganda